Jeeva (born 30 November 1952) is an Indian actor who works primarily in Telugu and Hindi films. He has been working in films since 1978 and is well known for his negative roles in various Ram Gopal Varma films, particularly Satya (as Jagga), Ab Tak Chhappan (as Commissioner Suchak) and Sarkar (as Swami Virendra). He has acted in around 250 films in Telugu and Hindi languages.

Personal life 
He was born as Kocharla Dayaratnam. He belongs to Guntur region. K. Balachander changed his name to Jeeva after his first film, changing his fortunes forever.
He named his son as K. Balachander. His son is a director of Telugu movies. He has seven siblings.

Career 
He made his debut as an actor with the film Tholi Kodi Koosindi, directed by K. Balachander. He was selected for this role from a number of aspirants. Later he worked with popular directors like Ram Gopal Varma, Vamsy, Krishna Vamsi, Puri Jagannadh etc.

Filmography

Films

Telugu

Hindi

Tamil

Kannada

Malayalam

Television

References

External links
 

Male actors in Telugu cinema
Indian male film actors
Living people
Telugu comedians
Indian male comedians
Male actors in Hindi cinema
Male actors in Tamil cinema
1952 births
20th-century Indian male actors
21st-century Indian male actors
People from Guntur
Telugu male actors
Male actors from Andhra Pradesh
People from Guntur district
Indian Christians